Terence John Nicholl (born 16 September 1952) is an English retired Association football midfielder who played professionally in both England and the United States. He later managed several indoor teams in the United States where he was the 1987 and 1988 American Indoor Soccer Association Coach of the Year.

Playing career
Nicholl's clubs included Crewe Alexandra, Sheffield United and Gillingham, where he made over 180 Football League appearances. In 1981, he moved to the USA where he signed with the Wichita Wings of the Major Indoor Soccer League.  He remained with the Wings until his retirement from playing following an injury-marred 1985–1986 season.

Coaching career
Nicholl then turned to coaching in America, as an assistant with indoor side Memphis Storm of the American Indoor Soccer Association. On 8 December 1986, the Storm fired head coach Gary Hindley and elevated Nicholl to head coach. He was named the 1987 and 1988 AISA Coach Of The Year. He won this award although he left the Storm just prior to the playoffs and moved to coach the Wichita Wings on 2 February 1988. After the Wings began the 1990–1991 season with a string of losses, the team ownership began mentioning the possibility of Nicholl's being fired. However, they reconsidered as the team began an upswing in December and January before again sliding down the table. On 5 February 1991, the Wings fired Nicholl with the team at 13–20. Nicholl, who has a degree in mechanical engineering, then went to work for Metalex, an aerospace firm in Cincinnati, Ohio. While this led to a tripling of his salary, he nearly accepted an offer to manage former club Gillingham in May 1991. He instead chose to remain as a sales representative for Metalex until July 1992 when he returned to coaching with the Dayton Dynamo of the National Professional Soccer League. He lasted until 24 January 1995. On 11 August 2003, the Cincinnati Excite of the American Indoor Soccer League hired Nicholl. He was fired on 14 June 2008. He then moved to coach the Cincinnati United Premier of the Super Y-League, a position he holds today. In addition, Nicholl coached the varsity boys soccer team, the Stingers, at Seven Hills School until retiring after a successful 2014 season. In the 2009 season, he led the Stingers to the state semifinals and they finished with a 19-2-1 record. In 2013, Terry led the Seven Hills Varsity team to a Regional Semi Final and finished the season 13-3-4.

Personal life
His brother Chris Nicholl and cousin Jimmy Nicholl were both also professional footballers.

References

External links
MISL stats

1952 births
Living people
American Indoor Soccer Association coaches
American Indoor Soccer League coaches
Crewe Alexandra F.C. players
English footballers
English expatriate footballers
English football managers
Gillingham F.C. players
Major Indoor Soccer League (1978–1992) coaches
Major Indoor Soccer League (1978–1992) players
National Professional Soccer League (1984–2001) coaches
People from Wilmslow
Sheffield United F.C. players
Wichita Wings (MISL) players
Sportspeople from Cheshire
Southend United F.C. players
Association football midfielders
High school soccer coaches in the United States